34 Kudi  is a village in the southern state of Karnataka, India. It is located in the Brahmavar taluk of Udupi district in Karnataka.

See also
 Udupi
 Districts of Karnataka

References

External links
 http://Udupi.nic.in/

Villages in Udupi district